The mountain viscacha rat or mountain vizcacha rat (Octomys mimax), historically viscacha rat or vizcacha rat, is a species of rodent in the family  Octodontidae. It is endemic to Argentina.

It is the only living species within the genus Octomys. This diploid genus (2n = 56) may be ancestral to the two unusual suspected tetraploid species Tympanoctomys barrerae and Pipanacoctomys aureus. However, some genetic studies have rejected any polyploidism in mammals as unlikely, and suggests that amplification and dispersion of repetitive sequences best explain the large genome size.

Description
The feet are relatively long, while the tail measures . It has light brown fur with white underparts and a bushy tail.

Unusual features of the viscacha rat include greatly enlarged auditory bullae, and the presence of numerous whiskers on the roof of the mouth behind the incisor teeth. The exact function of the whiskers is unclear, but they may enable the animal to sense the position of food inside the mouth.

Distribution and habitat
Mountain viscacha rats are found only in the Monte Desert region of northwestern Argentina, specifically in the provinces of Catamarca, La Rioja, San Luis, San Juan.

Behaviour
Mountain viscacha rats are nocturnal and solitary, spending the day sheltering in rock crevices. Although it does not construct burrows, it may place pieces of cactus close to crevice entrances to help protect against predators. They are herbivorous, feeding on the leaves and seeds of shrubland vegetation. During the dry season, their diet consists largely of the leaves of Prosopis trees, supplemented by caperbushes and alkaliweeds. During the wet season, they eat more seeds and fruit, including those from plants such as Maytenus and boxthorn shrubs.

References

External links

Mares, M. A.; Braun, J. K.; Barquez, R. M.; Díaz, M. M. 2000. Two new genera and species of halophytic desert mammals from isolated salt flats in Argentina. Occasional Papers, Museum of Texas Tech University 203:i+1-27.

Octodontidae
Mammals of Chile
Mammals of Argentina
Mammals described in 1920
Taxa named by Oldfield Thomas
Taxonomy articles created by Polbot
High Monte